Arthur Buller may refer to:

Arthur William Buller (1808–1869), British politician
Arthur Henry Reginald Buller (1874–1944), British-Canadian botanist